Torkaman Rural District is in the Central District of Urmia County, West Azerbaijan province, Iran. At the National Census of 2006, its population was 10,069 in 2,629 households. There were 9,893 inhabitants in 2,900 households at the following census of 2011. At the most recent census of 2016, the population of the rural district was 10,017 in 3,088 households. The largest of its 49 villages was Babarud, with 634 people.

References 

Urmia County

Rural Districts of West Azerbaijan Province

Populated places in West Azerbaijan Province

Populated places in Urmia County